Sipan is a village in the Alagyaz Municipality of the Aragatsotn Province of Armenia.

Etymology 
The village was previously known as Tamb, Pamb, Pambak ( or ), and Pamb Krdi. It was renamed Sipan in 1978.

History 
During the period of the Russian Empire, the village was part of the Alexandropol Uezd of the Erivan Governorate, and became populated by Yazidi Kurds from the Kars region.

In May 1918, the Ottomans crossed the river of Arpachay (Akhuryan) to wage a brief war against the Yerevan Republic. One column seized the city of Alexandropol and advanced north towards Mount Aragats, where 80 Yazidis got massacred in Pampa Kurda (Sipan).

Demographics 
The village is mostly populated by Yazidi Kurds.

Notable people 
Emerîkê Serdar

References

External links 
 
 

Populated places in Aragatsotn Province
Yazidi villages
Kurdish settlements in Armenia
Yazidi populated places in Armenia